The TNT Tropang Giga, is a Philippine 3x3 basketball team which competes in the PBA 3x3, organized by the Philippines' top-flight professional league, Philippine Basketball Association (PBA). The team is affiliated with a PBA member franchise of the same name.

History
The TNT Tropang Giga are among the participating PBA franchise teams in the inaugural 2021 PBA 3x3 season.

Current roster

References

PBA 3x3 teams
2021 establishments in the Philippines
Basketball teams established in 2021